Vương or Vuong is a Vietnamese surname, meaning King.

In the United States, Vuong was the 7,635th most common surname during the 1990 census and the 4,556th most common during the year 2000 census.

Notable people
 Vương Văn Đông, Army of the Republic of Vietnam colonel, staged the 1960 South Vietnamese coup attempt
 Vương Hữu Nhơn (born 1932), Vietnamese economist, The First General of State Audit of Vietnam (1994-2000), deputy director of Ministry of Finance (1979-1986), Vice President of Vietnamese People's Committee (1991-1996)
 Vương Tiến Dũng (born 1949), Vietnamese football coach
 Vương Đình Huệ (born 1957), Vietnamese politician, Minister of Finance (2011 - 2013), Deputy Prime Minister (from 2016)
 Vương Trung Hiếu (born 1959), Vietnamese writer
 Vương Anh Tuấn (born 1959), Vietnamese economist, General Director of Hotel Continental, Ho Chi Minh City, deputy director of Saigontourist (Tổng công ty Du lịch Sài Gòn)
 Vương Thị Huyền (born 1992), Vietnamese Olympic weightlifter
 Ocean Vuong (born 1988), American poet
 Quang Vuong, American economist, creator of Vuong's closeness test
 Chelsea Vuong, American beauty pageant titleholder who was crowned Miss Golden Gate 2018
 Lily Vuong, Canadian religious researcher, author of Gender and Purity in the Protevangelium of James
 Vương Hồng Sển, Vietnamese sociologist
 Vương Kiều Ân, Vietnamese poet
 Vương Quốc Mỹ, Deputy Minister, Ministry of Construction
 Vương Trí Nhàn, novelist

References

Vietnamese-language surnames